Jindřich Kinský (27 June 1927 – 8 April 2008) was a Czech basketball player. He competed in the men's tournament at the 1960 Summer Olympics.

References

External links
 

1927 births
2008 deaths
Czech men's basketball players
Olympic basketball players of Czechoslovakia
Basketball players at the 1960 Summer Olympics
Sportspeople from Prague